Tentax is a genus of moths of the family Erebidae. The genus was erected by Michael Fibiger in 2011.

Species

References

Micronoctuini
Noctuoidea genera